Van der Merwe Miszewski Architects is an architectural practice based in Cape Town, South Africa

History 
The company was founded in 1991 by directors Anya van der Merwe and Macio Miszewski.

Anya van der Merwe and Macio Miszewski met at the University of Cape Town School of Architecture in the early 1980s.

Anya van der Merwe completed the Bachelor of Architecture (BArch) with Distinction in 1984 before moving to London, England, to further her studies at the Architectural Association, from where she graduated with an Architectural Association Graduate Diploma in History and Theory (AAGradDip)in 1987. Anya left VDMMA as director in 2016.

Macio Miszewski obtained a Bachelor of Architectural Studies (BAS) from University of Cape Town in 1984 before also completing an Architectural Association Diploma at the Architectural Association in 1987.

Both Anya and Macio spent two years working at Arup Associates in London, before returning to South Africa in 1990, opening the practice shortly after.

Lloyd Rubidge joined the practice in 2000. Lloyd is also an alumnus of the University of Cape Town, having obtained a Bachelor of Architectural Studies in 1988, and a Bachelor of Architecture in 1991. In 2007 Lloyd became director.

Selected projects

Residential 
 Tree House, Cape Town, South Africa – 1999 
 Bridge House, Cape Town, South Africa  – 2001
 Light House, apartment building, Cape Town, South Africa – 2005
 Courtyard House, Cape Town, South Africa – 2006
 Highveldt House, Gauteng, South Africa – 2008
 Maison, Franschhoek, South Africa – 2009
 Forest House, Cape Town, South Africa – 2009
 Mountain House, Cape Town, South Africa 2010

Corporate 
 163 Bree Street, Architect's Office, Cape Town, South Africa – 1996
 BMD Textiles office building, Cape Town, South Africa – 1999
 Jenni Button, retail interior, Cape Town, South Africa – 2003
 De Beers corporate headquarters (lead design in association with Gapp and Lucien le Grange), Johannesburg, South Africa – 2004
 Hilton Weiner, retail interior, Pretoria, South Africa – 2004
 Exact, retail interior, Durban, South Africa, 2006

Public 
 Cape Town International Convention Center(lead design in association with Foreshore Architects), Cape Town, South Africa – 2003 
 Masimbambisane Secondary School, Cape Town, South Africa – 2003
 Gondwana Lodge, Barrydale, South Africa – 2009
 University of Cape Town Student Administration, Cape Town, South Africa – 2010
 University of Cape Town School of Economics, Cape Town, South Africa – 2011

Awards and competitions 
The company has been widely recognised and awarded, both in South Africa and internationally.

 South African Institute of Architects "Award of Merit", 1997 for Sun House
 South African Institute of Architects "Award of Merit", 1999 for Tree House
 UK Architectural Record "ar+d" international award competition, 1999 for Tree House
 World Architecture Award, international competition for best built residential project, 2001 for Tree House
 South African Institute for Civil Engineering, merit award, 2004 for Cape Town international Convention Center (lead design is association with Foreshore Architects)
 South African Institute of Steel Construction, national overall winner, 2004 for Cape Town international Convention Center(lead design is association with Foreshore Architects)
 Cape Institute of Architects, award of commendation, 2005 for Cape Town international Convention Center (lead design is association with Foreshore Architects)
 South African Institute of Architects, merit award, 2005 for Cape Town international Convention Center (lead design is association with Foreshore Architects)
 VISI magazine and South African Institute of Architects, "best building in South Africa" in public opinion poll, 2005 for Tree House
 South African Institute of Architects, award of commendation, 2005 for De Beers Corporate Headquarters (lead design in association with GAPP and Lucian le Grange)
 South African Institute of Steel Construction, residential winner, 2009 for Highveldt House
 Chicago Anthenaeum/European Center for Architecture International Architecture award, 2009 for Highveldt House
 Gauteng Institute of Architects, Regional award, 2009 for Highveldt House
 Cape Institute of Architects, Regional award, 2009 for Maison

Notes

References 
 Cooke, Julian. "Notes on the Van der Merwe Miszewski method." Architecture South Africa, November/December 2008
 Van der Merwe, Anya. "The Van der Merwe Miszewski Partnership." Architecture South Africa, November/December 2008
 Joubert, Ora. 2009, "10 Years + 100 Buildings", Cape Town, Bell-Roberts
 2004, "The Phaidon Atlas of Contemporary World Architecture", London, Phaidon Press Limited
 2008, "The Phaidon Atlas of 21st Century World Architecture", London, Phaidon Press Limited
 Van der Merwe Miszewski Architects. 2011, "Van der Merwe Miszewski 20 Years", Cape Town, Van der Merwe Miszewski Architects

External links

Architecture firms of South Africa
Companies based in Cape Town
Design companies established in 1991
South African companies established in 1991